Israel Pemberton Jr. - (b. 1715 - d. 1779 in Philadelphia) was an English-American merchant and founding manager of the Pennsylvania Hospital.

A grandson of a Quaker settler who migrated to the New World with William Penn in 1682, Pemberton profited from trade during King George's War. He ultimately was involved with funding Quaker schools and was a prominent proponent of Indian diplomacy, especially during the Seven Years' War. Notably, he funded Philadelphia's first fire company. In 1750, he was elected to the Pennsylvania Assembly. In the mid-1770s he tried to defend an Indian woman who had been brought to Pennsylvania as a slave from Virginia.

Pemberton was a member of the revived American Philosophical Society, elected in 1768.

References

Further reading
John W. Jordan (2004). Colonial And Revolutionary Families Of Pennsylvania. Genealogical Publishing Com. pp. 288–. .
Mary Ellen Snodgrass (8 April 2015). Civil Disobedience: An Encyclopedic History of Dissidence in the United States: An Encyclopedic History of Dissidence in the United States. Routledge. pp. 331–. .
Thompson Westcott (1877). The Historic Mansions and Buildings of Philadelphia: With Some Notice of Their Owners and Occupants. Porter & Coates. pp. 498–.

Quakers from Pennsylvania
People from Philadelphia
1715 births
1779 deaths